Dominic James Howard (born 7 December 1977) is an English musician who is the drummer and co-founder of the rock band Muse.

Early life
Howard was born in Stockport, Greater Manchester, in England. When he was around 8 years old he moved with his family to Teignmouth, a small town in Devon. He began playing drums at about the age of 12, when he was inspired by a jazz band performing at school.

Howard's first band was named Carnage Mayhem, which he was in at school. Meanwhile, he befriended Matt Bellamy, who played guitar but did not have a stable band. Not long after, Bellamy was offered the chance to join Howard's band. After two years of drop-outs, Bellamy suggested that they write their own songs, and only Howard and Bellamy remained. Chris Wolstenholme, who played drums in Fixed Penalty, then entered the scene and with a great "spirit of sacrifice" he began to play bass.

In the first months of 1994 Gothic Plague was born, followed by Rocket Baby Dolls and then finally Muse.

Howard is left-handed and drums on a left-handed drum kit. He also played drums in Vicky Cryer with Jason Hill from Louis XIV.

Muse

Muse released their debut album, Showbiz, in 1999, showcasing Bellamy's falsetto and a melancholic alternative rock style. Their second album, Origin of Symmetry (2001), expanded their sound, incorporating wider instrumentation and romantic classical influences, and earned them a reputation for energetic live performances. Absolution (2003) saw further classical influence, with orchestra on tracks such as "Butterflies and Hurricanes", and became the first of five consecutive UK number-one albums.

Black Holes and Revelations (2006) incorporated electronic and pop elements, influenced by 1980s groups such as Depeche Mode, displayed in singles such as "Supermassive Black Hole". The album brought Muse wider international success. The Resistance (2009) and The 2nd Law (2012) explored themes of government oppression and civil uprising and cemented Muse as one of the world's major stadium acts. Their seventh album, Drones (2015), was a concept album about drone warfare and returned to a harder rock sound.

Muse have won numerous awards, including two Grammy Awards, winning the Grammys for Best Rock Album for The Resistance and Drones, two Brit Awards, winning Best British Live Act twice, five MTV Europe Music Awards and eight NME Awards. In 2012 the band received the Ivor Novello Award for International Achievement from the British Academy of Songwriters, Composers and Authors. Muse have sold over 20 million albums worldwide.

Personal life
In 2004, Howard's father, William Howard, died of a heart attack shortly after watching Muse's performance at Glastonbury Festival.

In a session where he and Bellamy answered questions from fans, Howard stated that the celebrity, alive or dead, he'd most like to meet is Jimi Hendrix. He once had a dog called Hendrix.

On 26 September 2008, Howard, along with Bellamy and Wolstenholme, was awarded an Honorary Doctorate of Arts from the University of Plymouth.

References

External links

Dominic Howard fan site
Dominic Howard on MuseWiki

1977 births
Living people
Muse (band) members
British male drummers
English rock drummers
21st-century English musicians
Musicians from Manchester
Music in the Metropolitan Borough of Stockport
People from Stockport
People from Teignmouth 
Musicians from Devon
21st-century drummers